Negera natalensis is a moth in the family Drepanidae. It was described by Felder in 1874. It is found in Cameroon, the Central African Republic, the Democratic Republic of Congo, Gabon, Ghana, Ivory Coast, Nigeria, Senegal, Sierra Leone, South Africa, Tanzania, Gambia, Uganda and Zambia.

The larvae feed on Pavetta lanceolata and Coffea species.

Subspecies
Negera natalensis natalensis (South Africa)
Negera natalensis geometroides (Holland, 1893) (Cameroon, Central African Republic, Democratic Republic of Congo, Gabon, Ghana, Sierra Leone, Tanzania, Uganda, Zambia)
Negera natalensis parviluma Watson, 1965 (Ghana, Ivory Coast, Nigeria, Senegal, Gambia)

References

Moths described in 1874
Drepaninae
Moths of Africa